Morse and Wade Building, also known as the Yadkin Valley Hotel, is a historic commercial building located at East Bend,  Yadkin County, North Carolina.  It was built about 1890, and is a two-story, brick building on a brick foundation.  It has Italianate style design elements including arched window and door openings.  The building initially housed the Yadkin Valley Hotel in the east half and the Morse and Wade Store in the west half.  From about 1903 to 1940, it housed a tobacco bag factory.  It is the oldest known commercial building in East Bend.

It was listed on the National Register of Historic Places in 2005.

References

Commercial buildings on the National Register of Historic Places in North Carolina
Italianate architecture in North Carolina
Commercial buildings completed in 1890
Buildings and structures in Yadkin County, North Carolina
National Register of Historic Places in Yadkin County, North Carolina